Pete Fredenburg (born September 15, 1949) is a former American football coach. He served as the head football coach at University of Mary Hardin–Baylor in Belton, Texas from the progam's inception in 1997 until his retirement following the 2021 season; the program began play in 1998. Fredenburg led Mary Hardin–Baylor to three NCAA Division III Football Championship titles, in 2016, 2018, and 2021. The 2016 title later was later vacated. His 2004 squad finished as NCAA Division III runner-up, losing to Linfield. Before coming to Mary Hardin–Baylor, Fredenburg served as an assistant coach at Baylor University (1982–1993), Louisiana State University (1994), and Louisiana Tech University (1995–1996). He played college football at Southwest Texas State University—now known as Texas State University—from 1968 to 1970.

Fredenburg announced his retirement on January 7, 2022.

Head coaching record

College

See also
 List of college football coaches with 200 wins

Notes

References

External links
 Mary Hardin–Baylor profile

1949 births
Living people
Baylor Bears football coaches
Louisiana Tech Bulldogs football coaches
LSU Tigers football coaches
Mary Hardin–Baylor Crusaders football coaches
Texas State Bobcats football players
High school football coaches in Texas